Lake Suğla (anciently Trogitis) is a large lake in Konya Province, southwestern part of Turkey. It has an area of 25–80 km². The water level in the lake fluctuates. Lake Suğla is also an important wetland site for birds. In Graeco-Roman antiquity it was considered part of ancient Lycaonia.

References 

 Lake Suğla at BirdLife International

Sugla
Sugla